Herman Rosenkranz was a member of the Wisconsin State Assembly during the 1895 session. Rosenkranz represented the 1st District of Dodge County, Wisconsin. He was a Democrat.

References

People from Dodge County, Wisconsin
Year of birth missing
Year of death missing
Democratic Party members of the Wisconsin State Assembly